Gert Staal (1956) is a Dutch researcher, publicist and critic in the fields of design, architecture and urban design. Educated as linguist and art historian over the years he was active as journalist, editor, author, manager and teacher particularly in the those fields of Dutch design.

Biography  
Staal was born in 1956, and received his MA in Dutch language and art history at the University of Amsterdam.

In 1981 Staal began working as a design journalist for de Volkskrant, where he wrote about design events on a nearly weekly basis. In late 1983, he moved to the NRC Handelsblad, where he continued to write about design-related topics for a period of more than five years. In the 1990s he continued to write occasionally for the NRC Handelsblad, for de Volkskrant, and for Trouw. 

In the 1980s Staal had started writing and editing books on designers and design, and continued to do so over the years. In the next 40 years he wrote more than 50 publications. In the 1990s, he was chief editor at the Dutch design magazine Items for a while. When in 1993 the Netherlands Design Institute started, Staal was appointed deputy director under John Thackara. Later on he became a staff member of the Counsel for Culture, which advised the Dutch government on cultural matters.    

Beside all these activities Staal taught the AKV St. Joost and the Design Academy Eindhoven and participated in numerous design research and development projects.

Selected publications 
 Gert Staal and Hester Wolters (eds.), Holland in Vorm: Dutch Design, 1945-1987, The Hague: Stichting Holland in Vorm, 1987.
 Thomas Widdershoven and Gert Staal, Boris en de paraplu. Centraal Museum, 1998. .
 Gert Staal. Asking Questions: 10 Years of Architectural Design at the Gerrit Rietveld Academy. Rotterdam: 010 Publishers, 2004. .
 Louise Schouwenberg, Gert Staal, Martijn Goedegebuure, eds. House of Concepts: Design Academy Eindhoven, Amsterdam: Frame Publishers, 2008. 
 Gert Staal and curator Anne van der Zwaag (ed.) Pastoe: 100 jaar vernieuwing in vormgeving, geschreven door designcriticus, 2013.

References

External links 

 Gert Staal

1956 births
Living people
Dutch art historians
University of Amsterdam alumni
20th-century Dutch journalists
Male journalists
Dutch magazine editors
20th-century Dutch male writers
21st-century Dutch male writers
20th-century Dutch historians
21st-century Dutch historians